Al-Nasir Faraj or Nasir-ad-Din Faraj (Circassian: Фэрадж ан-Насир) (Urdu; Arabic;; r. 1399–1412 CE) also Faraj ibn Barquq was born in 1386 and succeeded his father Sayf-ad-Din Barquq as the second Sultan of the Burji dynasty of the Mamluk Sultanate of Egypt in July 1399 with the title Al-Nasir. He was only thirteen years old when he became Sultan on the sudden death of his father. His reign was marked by anarchy, pandemonium and chaos with invasions of Tamerlane (Timur Leng, or Timur Beg Gurkani), including the sack of Damascus in 1400, incessant rebellions in Cairo, endless conflicts with the Emirs of Syria (with the Sultan and also amongst themselves), along with plague and famine which reduced the population of the kingdom to one-third.

In September 1405, Faraj was afraid from the surrounding conspiracies, so he escaped his rule and was replaced briefly by his brother Izz ad-Din Abd al-Aziz, then he regained his position in November the same year.

During the end of his reign he became a tyrannical ruler which eventually led him into his seventh and final conflict with the Syrian Emirs at Baalbek. Defeated in battle he fled to the Citadel of Damascus. Unable to escape, he surrendered and on May 23, 1412 he was stabbed to death in his prison cell by a hired assassin. The Emirs placed on the throne as a temporary measure Caliph Al-Musta'in Billah. Faraj was buried in Bab AL-Faradis cemetery in Damascus.

Family
One of his wives was Khawand Fatima, the sister of the Islamic historian Ibn Taghribirdi. After Faraj's death, she married Inal Nauruzi. One of his concubines was Lâ Aflaha man Zalama. She gave birth to Faraj's son, Ghars ad-Din Khalil. Another concubine was Thuraiya. She gave birth to Faraj's daughter, Khawand Asiya. Another daughter of Faraj named Khawand Satita married Sidi Ibrahim, son of Sultan Al-Mu'ayyad Shaykh. She died in 1416. Another daughter, Khawand Shakra, married Amir Jarbash al-Muhammadi and had a son, Nasir ad-Din Muhammad. She died in 1482.

See also
Siege of Damascus (1400)
Khanqah of Faraj ibn Barquq

References

1386 births
1412 deaths
Burji sultans
15th-century Mamluk sultans
Circassian Mamluks